Jack Gleeson (born 20 May 1992) is an Irish actor who played Joffrey Baratheon on the HBO television series Game of Thrones (2011–2014). Following this role, Gleeson took a hiatus from acting, but has since taken part in independent theatre and the 2020 BBC miniseries Out of Her Mind. He will appear in the upcoming Irish thriller film In the Land of Saints and Sinners.

Early life
Gleeson was born in Cork, Ireland, and raised in Ranelagh, Dublin, where he attended Gonzaga College. He has two older sisters, Rachel and Emma, who are also involved in Irish theatre. He attended drama classes with them when he was young, and also performed in youth theatre.

Gleeson attended Trinity College Dublin between 2010 and 2015. He studied philosophy and theology and was elected a scholar at the university in 2012. At Trinity, Gleeson was a member of DU Players, where he met his future co-founders of Collapsing Horse Theatre Company.

Career
Gleeson began acting at the age of 8, in the Independent Theatre Workshop. His first roles were in films such as Reign of Fire (2002), Batman Begins (2005), Shrooms (2007), and A Shine of Rainbows (2009). In 2010, he appeared in a leading role in All Good Children. The reviewer for Variety magazine considered Gleeson "the pic's big discovery".

Gleeson starred as Joffrey Baratheon in the HBO series Game of Thrones. He cited Joaquin Phoenix's portrayal of Commodus in Gladiator (2000) as an influence on his performance.

In 2012, Gleeson indicated an intention to retire from acting to pursue an academic career once his work on Game of Thrones was finished. In 2014, Gleeson retired from acting after concluding his work in Game of Thrones. In an interview, he stated that while he had previously been interested in pursuing academia, he had since "gone off that idea".

Throughout the 2010s, Gleeson was a company member of the Dublin-based Collapsing Horse Theatre Company, of which he was also a founder and producer. He was part of the original cast in the company's first theatre production Monster / Clock, a children's theater show which premiered in Dublin in 2012. He next appeared in the company's "lo-fi comedy" Bears in Space which premiered in Dublin in July 2014 and took part of the 2014 Edinburgh Festival Fringe. The show was well reviewed and had revival productions in Dublin and London in 2015 and off-Broadway in New York in September 2016 as part of Origin's 1st Irish theatre festival. Collapsing Horse came to an end in November 2019.

In 2019, Gleeson made two public appearances. In June, he was featured in the musical-comedy program AMUSICAL at the Kilkenny Cat Laughs comedy festival in Kilkenny, Ireland with comedians Eleanor Tiernan and Alison Spittle. In August, he made a surprise appearance at Over the Top Wrestling's Trinity Brawl 2 event in Dublin where he played the face, aptly called "TV's Jack Gleeson," opposite Irish wrestler J Money.

In 2020, Gleeson returned to television in Sara Pascoe's series Out of Her Mind.

Personal life
Gleeson lives in Dublin; he previously lived in London.

In May 2018, Gleeson publicly supported the campaign to repeal Ireland's Eighth Amendment.

On August 27, 2022, Gleeson married his longtime girlfriend Roisin O'Mahony  in a ceremony in County Kerry, Ireland.

Filmography

Film

Television

Theatre

References

External links

 

1992 births
21st-century Irish male actors
Irish expatriates in England
Irish male child actors
Irish male film actors
Irish male television actors
Living people
Male actors from Cork (city)
Male actors from Dublin (city)
People from Ranelagh
Scholars of Trinity College Dublin